In subterranean civil engineering, ventilation shafts, also known as airshafts or vent shafts, are vertical passages used in mines and tunnels to move fresh air underground, and to remove stale air. 

In architecture, an airshaft, also known as a lightwell, is typically a small, vertical space within a tall building which permits ventilation of the building's interior spaces to the outside. The floor plan of a building with an airshaft is often described as a "square donut" shape. Alternatively, an airshaft may be formed between two adjacent buildings. Windows on the interior side of the donut allow air from the building to be exhausted into the shaft, and, depending on the height and width of the shaft, may also allow extra sunlight inside.

See also
 Ventilation (architecture)
 Stack effect
 Underground mine ventilation
 Courtyard
 Lightwell
 Skylight
 Atrium (architecture)

References

External links

Design and construction of a surface air cooling and refrigeration installation at a South African mine, a paper presented at the North American Mine Ventilation Symposium 2008
HVAC Services

Ventilation
Tunnels
Mine ventilation